Detestation is the debut LP by Japanese hardcore punk band G.I.S.M. Released on Dogma Records in 1984, the record displays a unique blend of musical influences that the band would become notable for, ranging from industrial to glam metal guitar work. The album has had a very large impact across numerous musical scenes, and its songs have been covered by many notable hardcore punk and extreme metal bands, including Poison Idea, Integrity, and Extreme Noise Terror. Due to the cult status and the scarcity of the original record, it was up until 2020 one of the most bootlegged records of all time, and had only seen one official reissue in 1992 on Compact Disc on Sakevi Yokoyama's label Beast Arts. It was also released as an extended compilation in 2015 by Beast Arts on Compact Disc.

Musical Style 
The album is notable for its unusual mixture of musical styles. While the bass and drums stylistically resemble standard hardcore punk, Randy Uchida's flashy and melodic guitar work, reminiscent of heavy metal, sets it apart from the typical punk rock format. Similarly, Sakevi Yokoyama's deep growls and screams would later be cited as an influential vocal technique among extreme metal vocalists.

The lyrics, which are penned by Sakevi and often feature broken English, depict violent illustrations of war - this theme can also be found in his notorious P.O.W. magazine.

Track listing

Personnel 

 Shigehisa "Sakevi" Yokoyama − lead vocals
 Randy Uchida − guitar
 Kannon "Cloudy" Masuo − bass
 Tohru "Mario" Hiroshima − drums
 James SK Wān – electric sitar

Production 

 G.I.S.M. – producer
 Konishi Koji, Onuki Takanobu – engineer
 Randy Uchida, Sakevi Yokoyama – graphic design, sleeve

References

1984 debut albums